Mumbai Suburban district (Marathi: Mumbai Upanagar Jilhā) is the second most populous district of Maharashtra in the Konkan Division. With its administrative headquarters in Bandra, the district consists of three subdivisions or tehsils (townships): Kurla, Andheri, and Borivali. The district along with Mumbai City district and other suburban localities make up Greater Mumbai. The district occupies an area of 446 km2.

This is the second smallest district of Maharashtra, and the jurisdiction of Mumbai Suburban district extends from Bandra to Dahisar, from Kurla to Mulund, and from Kurla up to Trombay creek. The district is one of the largest in the country by population. The current population is 9,356,962, according to the 2011 census of India, making it the fifth most populous district in India (out of 672). The Mithi River is the main river in the district.

Officer

Members of Parliament

Gopal Shetty (BJP) 
Gajanan Kirtikar (SS(UBT))  
Manoj Kotak (BJP) 
Poonam Mahajan (BJP) 
Rahul Shewale (BSS)

Guardian Minister

list of Guardian Minister

District Magistrate/Collector

list of District Magistrate / Collector

History
Mumbai Suburban district was created on 1 October 1990 when Mumbai district was bifurcated into Mumbai City and Mumbai Suburban districts.

Geography

Many important places have adorned the beauty of this district, including Mount Mary Church, Jogeshwari Caves, Mahakali Caves, Essel World, Water Kingdom, Marve Beach, Aksa Beach, Madh Island, Sanjay Gandhi National Park, Aarey Colony, Kanheri Caves, Film City, Tulsi Lake, Vihar Lake and Powai Lake.

Climate

Demographics

According to the 2011 census, Mumbai Suburban district has a population of 9,356,962, roughly equal to the nation of Benin or the US state of North Carolina. This gives it a ranking of 5th in India (out of a total of 640). Its population growth rate over the decade 2001-2011 was 8.01%. Mumbai Suburban has a sex ratio of 857 females for every 1000 males, and a literacy rate of 90.9%. Scheduled Castes and Scheduled Tribes make up 6.23% and 1.12% of the population respectively.

Languages

Marathi is the most spoken language. Hindi is the second most-spoken language and the fastest growing, and has become the common language in the district. Urdu is spoken by the Muslim community in the district. Gujarati and Marwari are spoken by the large business communities in the district. Tamil, Bhojpuri, Konkani, Telugu, Malayalam, Tulu and Bengali are minority language spoken by recent arrivals.

See also
Western Suburbs
Eastern Suburbs
South Mumbai
Mumbai

References

External links

Official website of Mumbai suburban district
Maharashtra government

 
Districts of Maharashtra
Konkan division
1990 establishments in Maharashtra